Viișoara (called Băsești until 1968) is a commune in Vaslui County, Western Moldavia, Romania. It is composed of four villages: Halta Dodești, Văleni, Viișoara and Viltotești. It included Dodești and Urdești villages until 2004, when these were split off to form Dodești Commune.

References

Communes in Vaslui County
Localities in Western Moldavia